The Donkeys may refer to:

The Donkeys (band), an indie band from San Diego, California
The Donkeys (British band), band from the 70's
Lions led by donkeys
Led By Donkeys, and anti-Brexit campaign group